State Route 197 (SR 197) is a secondary west-east state road located in West Tennessee.

Route description

SR 197 starts at US 45 (SR 5) in Pinson in Madison County. It crosses the South Fork of the Forked Deer River and is called locally Ozier Road and  after approximately 2.5 miles passes Pinson Mounds. At 4.0 miles along its length it passes through Five Points and becomes Diamond Grove Road. Diamond Grove Road continues for 3.9 miles and then makes a right turn onto Mifflin Road and in 0.4 of a mile passes the southern terminus of SR 198 before passing into Chester County at the 10.3 mile mark or 2 miles from SR 198. It then terminates in Mifflin at SR 200.

Major intersections

References

External links

197
Transportation in Madison County, Tennessee
Transportation in Chester County, Tennessee